Dimantis is a genus of praying mantises with one identified species, Dimantis haani.

See also
List of mantis genera and species

References

Mantidae